Aalborg Damehåndbold is a former team handball club for women from Aalborg, Denmark.

History
Aalborg DH was promoted to the top league in Denmark in 2002–2003. The club finished second in the top league once, and obtained third place in 2005–2006. In the 2005–2006 season the club reached the semi final in the Women's EHF Champions League.

Aalborg DH was 3 Sept. 2013 declared bankrupt.

Former players 

 Louise Mortensen (2003–2010)
 Lærke Møller (2006–2009)
 Mathilde Nielsen (2012–2013)
 Rikke Nielsen (1997–2006, 2007–2008)
 Louise Pedersen (2004–2008)
 Sabine Pedersen (2010–2012)
 Rikke Schmidt (2005–2006)
 Søs Søby (2009–2013)
 Rikke Vestergaard (2006–2007, 2009–2011)
 Julie Aagaard (2009–2011)
 Heidi Astrup (2003–2005)
 Kristina Bille (2007–2010)
 Karen Brødsgaard (2007–2010)
 Rikke Ebbesen (2009–2013)
 Trine Nielsen (2004–2006)
 Louise Kristensen (2009–2011)
 Pernille Larsen (2007–2009)
 Mia Hundvin (2003–2004)
 Katrine Lunde Haraldsen (2004–2007)
 Kristine Lunde-Borgersen (2004–2007)
 Heidi Løke (2007–2008)
 Nora Mørk (2007)
 Thea Mørk (2007)
 Marianne Rokne (2005–2006)
 Isabel Blanco (2004–2006)
 Siri Seglem (2009–2013)
 Maria Olsson (2012–2013)
 Linnea Torstenson (2008–2010)
 Teresa Utković (2008–2009)
 Johanna Ahlm (2009–2010)
 Therese Wallter (2008–2010)
 Johanna Wiberg (2006–2007)
 Madeleine Grundström (2008–2009)
 Frida Toveby (2008–2010)
 Matilda Boson (2005–2010)
 Ibolya Mehlmann (2006–2008)
 Ágnes Farkas (2003–2005)
 Barbara Bognár (2007–2008)
 Kristina Logvin (2012–2013)
 Tanja Logwin (2006–2009)
 Julie Goiorani (2010–2011)
 Mariama Signaté (2010–2011)
 Arna Sif Pálsdóttir (2011–2013)
 Narcisa Lecușanu (2004–2006)
 Ana Batinić (2009–2011)
 Natasja Burgers (2005–2006)
 Natalya Deryugina (2003–2008)

Head coach history

References
Official website

Defunct handball clubs in Denmark
Sport in Aalborg